Lieberman Software Corporation is a cyber security software firm that develops automated privileged identity management and secure privileged access management software.

In January 2018, Lieberman Software got acquired by Bomgar Corporation.

History

The company was first formed as Lieberman and Associates in 1978 by Philip Lieberman.

It became an Independent software vendor in 2004 under the name, "Lieberman Software Corporation".

In May 2014, Lieberman Software introduced new privileged user management (PUM) capabilities in the Enterprise Random Password Manager™ (ERPM) at Microsoft TechEd 2014 in Houston, TX. The new PUM capabilities allow users to launch cross-platform applications in a secure environment, where elevated operations are automatically authorized, recorded and audited.

In June 2015, Lieberman Software was deemed Microsoft 2015 Application Development Partner of the Year.

In 2016, Lieberman Software was awarded the 2016 Cybersecurity Excellence Award. In the same year it was also awarded American Security Today 2016 Homeland Security Award.

In 2017, Lieberman Software won Info Security Products Guide Global Excellence Award for Best Identity Management. In the same year Lieberman Software announced a new partner integration with SailPoint IdentityIQ. A few months later at Black Hat in Las Vegas, Lieberman Software announced a partnership with VeriClouds. The same month, Lieberman Software announced its Lieberman RED - Rapid Enterprise Defense™ Suite.

On February 1, 2018, Lieberman Software announced that it was acquired by Bomgar.

References

External links
 Bomgar website
 Bellevue Business Journal:Microsoft 2015 Partner of the Year Awards Revealed
ABC News Interviews Philip Lieberman About Netflix Hack

Defunct software companies of the United States